George Duvivier (August 17, 1920 – July 11, 1985) was an American jazz double-bassist.

Biography
Duvivier was born in New York City, the son of Leon V. Duvivier and Ismay Blakely Duvivier. He attended the Conservatory of Music and Art, where he studied violin. At age sixteen, he worked as assistant concertmaster for the Central Manhattan Symphony Orchestra. He began playing double bass and concentrated on composition at New York University. In the early 1940s, he accompanied Coleman Hawkins, Lucky Millinder, and Eddie Barefield. After serving in the U.S. Army, he worked as an arranger for Jimmie Lunceford, then as arranger and bassist for Sy Oliver.

In the 1950s, he accompanied Lena Horne on her tour in Europe. He recorded for commercials, television shows, and movie soundtracks. Although he spent most of his career as a sideman, he recorded as a leader in 1956 with Martial Solal for Coronet. For four years beginning in 1953, he worked steadily with Bud Powell. He also worked with Count Basie, Benny Carter, Benny Goodman, Chico Hamilton, Hank Jones, Shelly Manne, Oliver Nelson, Frank Sinatra, Clark Terry, Ben Webster, and Bob Wilber.

He died of cancer in New York, aged 64. His mother Ismay Duvivier, once a dancer, donated a large collection of papers, including letters and scrapbooks of her career and his, to the Institute of Jazz Studies at Rutgers University.

Discography
With Pepper Adams
 The Cool Sound of Pepper Adams (Regent, 1957)

With Manny Albam
 Jazz Goes to the Movies (Impulse!, 1962)

With Joe Albany
 Portrait of an Artist (Elektra, 1982)

With Gene Ammons
 Up Tight! (Prestige, 1961)
 Boss Soul! (Prestige, 1961)
 Soul Summit Vol. 2 (Prestige, 1962)
 The Soulful Moods of Gene Ammons (Moodsville, 1962)
 Late Hour Special (Prestige, 1962 [1964])
 Sock! (Prestige, 1962 [1965])
 Night Lights (Prestige, 1970 [1985])

With Mildred Anderson
 Person to Person (Bluesville, 1960)

With Louis Armstrong
Louis Armstrong and His Friends (Flying Dutchman, 1970)

With Count Basie
 Memories Ad-Lib (Roulette, 1958)
 String Along with Basie (Roulette, 1960)
 Basie Swingin' Voices Singin' (ABC-Paramount, 1966)
 High Voltage (MPS, 1970)

With Louis Bellson
 Louis Bellson Quintet (Norgran, 1954)
 Drummer's Holiday (Verve, 1958)

With George Benson, Al Harewood and Mickey Tucker
 Jazz on a Sunday Afternoon, Volume 1 (Accord, 1973) 
 Jazz on a Sunday Afternoon, Volume 2 (Accord, 1973) 
 Jazz on a Sunday Afternoon, Volume 3 (Accord, 1973)

With Bob Brookmeyer
 Portrait of the Artist (Atlantic, 1960)
 Gloomy Sunday and Other Bright Moments (Verve, 1961)

With Ruth Brown 
 Ruth Brown (Atlantic, 1957)

With Ray Bryant
 Here's Ray Bryant (Pablo, 1976)

With Kenny Burrell
 Bluesin' Around (Columbia, 1962 [1983])
 Blue Bash! (Verve, 1963)

With Benny Carter
 Benny Carter Plays Pretty (Norgran, 1954)
 New Jazz Sounds (Norgran, 1954)
 'Live and Well in Japan! (Pablo Live, 1978)

With Ron Carter
 Where? (New Jazz, 1961)

With Sonny Clark and Max Roach
 Sonny Clark Trio (Time, 1960)

With Arnett Cobb
 Blow Arnett, Blow (Prestige, 1959) – with Eddie "Lockjaw" Davis
 Smooth Sailing (Prestige, 1959)
 Live at Sandy's! (Muse, 1978)
 Keep On Pushin' (Bee Hive, 1984)

With Al Cohn
 Son of Drum Suite (RCA Victor, 1960)
 Body and Soul (Muse, 1973)

With Sam Cooke
 My Kind of Blues (RCA Victor, 1961)

With Eddie "Lockjaw" Davis
 Count Basie Presents Eddie Davis Trio + Joe Newman (Roulette, 1958)
 Eddie Davis Trio Featuring Shirley Scott, Organ (Roulette, 1959)
 The Eddie Davis Trio Featuring Shirley Scott (Roost, 1958)
 The Eddie "Lockjaw" Davis Cookbook (Prestige, 1958)
 Jaws (Prestige, 1958)
 The Eddie "Lockjaw" Davis Cookbook, Vol. 2 (Prestige, 1958)
 The Eddie "Lockjaw" Davis Cookbook Volume 3 (Prestige, 1958)
 Smokin' (Prestige, 1958) – released 1964
 Very Saxy (Prestige, 1959)
 Jaws in Orbit (Prestige, 1959)
 Bacalao (Prestige, 1959)
 Eddie "Lockjaw" Davis with Shirley Scott (Moodsville, 1960)
 I Only Have Eyes for You (Prestige, 1962)
 Trackin' (Prestige, 1962)
 Misty (Moodsville, 1963)
 The Heavy Hitter (Muse, 1979)

With Buddy DeFranco
 Like Someone in Love (Progressive, 1977)

With Eric Dolphy
 Out There (Prestige, 1960)

With Art Farmer
 Listen to Art Farmer and the Orchestra (Mercury, 1962)
 Baroque Sketches (Columbia, 1967)

With Jimmy Forrest
 Soul Street (New Jazz, 1960)

With Ronnie Foster
 Two Headed Freap (Blue Note, 1972)

With Aretha Franklin
 Unforgettable: A Tribute to Dinah Washington (Columbia Records, 1964)

With Bud Freeman
 The Bud Freeman All-Stars featuring Shorty Baker (Swingville, 1960) with Shorty Baker

With Stan Getz
 Stan Getz With Guest Artist Laurindo Almeida (Verve, 1963)
 Reflections (Verve, 1963)

With Dizzy Gillespie
 A Portrait of Duke Ellington (Verve, 1960)
 Perceptions (Verve, 1961) 
 Giants (Perception, 1971)

With Paul Gonsalves
 Cleopatra Feelin' Jazzy (Impulse!, 1963)

With Honi Gordon
 Honi Gordon Sings (1962)

With Gigi Gryce
 Reminiscin' (Mercury, 1960)

With Chico Hamilton
 Chico Hamilton Trio (Pacific Jazz, 1956)

With Roland Hanna
 Destry Rides Again (ATCO, 1959)

With Wilbur Harden
 The King and I (Savoy, 1958)

With Barry Harris
 Vicissitudes (MPS, 1972)
 Barry Harris Plays Barry Harris (Xanadu, 1978)

With Coleman Hawkins
 Coleman Hawkins and Confrères (Verve, 1958)
 Hawk Eyes (Prestige, 1959)
 Coleman Hawkins and His Orchestra (Crown, 1960)
 The Hawk Swings  (Crown, 1960)

With Donna Hightower
 Take One (Capitol, 1959)

With Johnny Hodges 
 Con-Soul & Sax (RCA Victor, 1965) with Wild Bill Davis
 Blue Notes (Verve, 1966)

With Lena Horne
 Stormy Weather (RCA Victor, 1957)
 Lena on the Blue Side (RCA Victor, 1962)

With Bobbi Humphrey
 Flute In (Blue Note, 1971)

With Janis Ian
 Stars (Columbia Records, 1974)
 Aftertones (Columbia Records, 1975)

With Milt Jackson
 Vibrations (Atlantic, 1960–61)

With Illinois Jacquet
 Spectrum (Argo, 1965)
 Illinois Jacquet Quartet Live at Schaffhausen, Switzerland, March 18, 1978

With Budd Johnson
 Let's Swing! (Swingville, 1960)
 Ya! Ya! (Argo, 1964)
 Off the Wall (Argo, 1964)

With Etta Jones
 Something Nice (Prestige, 1961)
 So Warm (Prestige, 1961)
 Lonely and Blue (Prestige, 1962)
 Save Your Love for Me (Muse, 1980)

With Hank Jones
 Bop Redux (Muse, 1977)
 I Remember You (Black & Blue, 1977)
 Compassion (Black & Blue, 1978)
 Bluesette (Black & Blue, 1979)

With Ben E. King
 Spanish Harlem (Atco Records, 1961)
 Don't Play That Song! (Atco Records, 1962)
 Young Boy Blues (Atco Records, 1964)

With Jeanne Lee and Ran Blake
 The Newest Sound Around (RCA Victor, 1962)

With John Lewis
 The Golden Striker (Atlantic, 1960)
 The Wonderful World of Jazz (Atlantic, 1960)
 Essence (Atlantic, 1962)

With Mundell Lowe
 Porgy & Bess (RCA Camden, 1958)
 Themes from Mr. Lucky, the Untouchables and Other TV Action Jazz (RCA Camden, 1960)
 Satan in High Heels (soundtrack) (Charlie Parker, 1961)

With Johnny Lytle
 The Loop (Tuba, 1965)
 New and Groovy (Tuba, 1966)
 Everything Must Change (Muse, 1977)

With Junior Mance
 The Soul of Hollywood (Jazzland, 1962)

With Barry Manilow
 2:00 AM Paradise Cafe (Arista, 1984)

With Shelly Manne
 2-3-4 (Impulse!, 1962)

With Don McLean
 Homeless Brother (United Artists Records, 1974)

With Gil Mellé
 Quadrama (Prestige, 1957)

With Wes Montgomery
 Goin' Out of My Head (Verve, 1966)

With Moondog
 Moondog (Columbia, 1969)

With Gerry Mulligan
 Idol Gossip (Chiaroscuro, 1976)

With Mark Murphy
 Rah (Riverside, 1961)

With Oliver Nelson
 Soul Battle (Prestige, 1960) – with Jimmy Forrest
 Screamin' the Blues (New Jazz Records, 1961)
 Straight Ahead (Oliver Nelson album) (New Jazz Records, 1961)
 Impressions of Phaedra (United Artists Jazz, 1962)
 Happenings  (Impulse!, 1966)
 The Spirit of '67 (Impulse!, 1967)
 The Kennedy Dream – Oliver Nelson (Impulse!, 1967)

With Phineas Newborn, Jr.
 Phineas Newborn, Jr. Plays Harold Arlen's Music from Jamaica (RCA Victor, 1957)

With Herbie Nichols
 Love, Gloom, Cash, Love (Bethlehem, 1957)

With Anita O'Day
 All the Sad Young Men (Verve, 1962)

With Chico O'Farrill
 Spanish Rice  (Impulse!, 1966)
 Nine Flags (Impulse!, 1966)

With Jackie Paris
 The Song Is Paris (Impulse!, 1962)

With Houston Person
 Sweet Buns & Barbeque (Prestige, 1972)

With Esther Phillips
 Esther Phillips Sings (Atlantic, 1966)

With Dave Pike
 Limbo Carnival (New Jazz, 1962)

With Bucky Pizzarelli
 Songs for New Lovers (Stash, 1978)

With Bud Powell
 The Amazing Bud Powell Vol. 2 (Blue Note, 1953)

With Freddie Redd
 Lonely City (Uptown, 1985 [1989])

With Red Rodney
 Home Free (Muse, 1977 [1979])
 The 3R's (Muse, 1979 [1982])

With Jimmy Rushing 
 Every Day I Have the Blues (BluesWay, 1967)

With A. K. Salim
 Stable Mates (Savoy, 1957)
 Blues Suite (Savoy, 1958)

With Lalo Schifrin
 Between Broadway & Hollywood (MGM, 1963)
 New Fantasy (Verve, 1964)

With Gunther Schuller
 Jazz Abstractions (Atlantic, 1960)

With Shirley Scott
 Great Scott! (Prestige, 1958)
 Scottie (Prestige, 1958)
 The Shirley Scott Trio (Moodsville, 1958)
 Scottie Plays the Duke (Prestige, 1959)
 Shirley's Sounds (Prestige, 1958–60)
 Soul Sister (Prestige 1960)
 Like Cozy (Moodsville, 1960)
 Now's the Time (Prestige, 1958–64)
 Great Scott!! (Impulse!, 1964)
 Roll 'Em: Shirley Scott Plays the Big Bands (Impulse!, 1966)
 Soul Duo (Impulse!, 1966) – with Clark Terry
 Girl Talk (Impulse!, 1967)

With Carrie Smith
 Do Your Duty (Black & Blue, 1976)
 Carrie Smith (West 54, 1979)

With Derek Smith
 Love for Sale (Progressive, 1978)

With Jimmy Smith
 Got My Mojo Workin' (Verve, 1966)

With Johnny Smith
 Johnny Smith (Verve, 1967)

With Leon Spencer
 Where I'm Coming From (Prestige, 1973)

With Sonny Stitt
 What's New!!! (Roulette, 1966)
 I Keep Comin' Back! (Roulette, 1966)
 Parallel-a-Stitt (Roulette, 1967)
 Goin' Down Slow (Prestige, 1972)
 In Style (Muse, 1982)
 The Last Sessions (Muse, 1982)

With Buddy Tate
 Live at Sandy's (Muse, 1978 [1980])
 Hard Blowin' (Muse, 1978 [1984])

With Billy Taylor
 Kwamina (Mercury, 1961)

With Clark Terry
 Mumbles (Mainstream, 1966)
 It's What's Happenin' (Impulse!, 1967)

With Joe Thomas and Jay McShann
 Blowin' in from K.C. (Uptown, 1983)

With Cal Tjader
 Several Shades of Jade (Verve, 1963)
 Breeze from the East (Verve, 1963)
 Warm Wave (Verve, 1964)
 El Sonido Nuevo (Verve, 1967) with Eddie Palmieri 
 Last Bolero in Berkeley (Fantasy, 1973)

With Stanley Turrentine
 Stan "The Man" Turrentine (Time, 1960 [1963])

With Sarah Vaughan
 Dreamy (Roulette, 1960)
 After Hours (Roulette, 1961)
 ¡Viva! Vaughan (Mercury Records, 1965)

With Warren Vaché Jr.
 Iridescence (Concord Jazz, 1981 [1999])

With Eddie "Cleanhead" Vinson
 Live at Sandy's (Muse, 1978 [1981])
 Hold It Right There! (Muse, 1978 [1984])

With Mal Waldron
 Sweet Love, Bitter (Impulse!, 1967)

With Walter Wanderley
 Moondreams (A&M/CTI, 1969)

With Julius Watkins
 French Horns for My Lady (Philips, 1962)

With Chuck Wayne
 The Jazz Guitarist (Savoy, 1953 [1956])

With Ben Webster
 Music for Loving (Norgran, 1954)
 Wanted to Do One Together (Columbia, 1962) with "Sweets" Edison

With Frank Wess
 Southern Comfort (Prestige, 1962)

With Randy Weston
 Uhuru Afrika (Roulette, 1960)

With Bob Wilber & Kenny Davern
 Soprano Summit (Chiaroscuro, 1977)

With Joe Wilder
 The Pretty Sound (Columbia, 1959)

With Joe Williams
 Having the Blues Under European Sky (Denon, 1985) 

With Lem Winchester
 Lem Winchester with Feeling (Moodsville, 1961)

With Lester Young
 Laughin' to Keep from Cryin' (Verve, 1958)

References

External links
 George Duvivier recordings at the Discography of American Historical Recordings.
George Duvivier at Verve Records
Tom Waits - Letterman 12-21-83

1920 births
1985 deaths
Musicians from New York City
American jazz double-bassists
Male double-bassists
Swing double-bassists
Bebop double-bassists
20th-century American musicians
20th-century double-bassists
Deaths from cancer in New York (state)
Jazz musicians from New York (state)
20th-century American male musicians
American male jazz musicians
New York University alumni